Lange Voorhout 62 is a former mansion on the Lange Voorhout in The Hague, Netherlands. The building is in use by the Statenbank.

History
The building was owned by Gerard Hoet II, the son of the decorative painter Gerard Hoet. He commissioned the paintings in the salon by the Hague painter P.C. la Fargue. After he died the house was sold to Adriaan Senn van Basel, who had it remodeled in neoclassical style.

References

Rijksmonuments in The Hague
History of The Hague